Poet in My Window was the second studio album by the singer-songwriter Nanci Griffith, released in 1982. A reissue of the album included a bonus track, "Can't Love Wrong", in the unusual position as the album's lead-off track, preceding all of the original tracks. Griffith wrote all but one of the album's tunes.

Critical reception
Ronnie D. Lankford, Jr., for AllMusic, wrote that "While Poet in My Window is only a small step up from Nanci Griffith's debut, the album finds her inching toward the mature art of Once in a Very Blue Moon."

Track listing

Personnel
Nanci Griffith – acoustic guitar, lead vocals, harmony vocals
Brian Wood – acoustic lead guitar, pedal steel, harmony vocals
Wells Young – piano, synthesizer and bass on "October Reasons"
Eric Taylor – bass
Evelyne Taylor – harmony vocals
John Hill – drums
The Gulf Coasters – harmony vocals on "Wheels"
Marlin Griffith – tenor
Al Copp – bass
John Grosnick – lead
Dick Blatter – baritone
Mo Rector – vocal arrangement

Production

Nanci Griffith – Producer
John Hill – Producer, engineer
Laurie Hill – Producer, engineer
Brian Wood – Associate Producer
Tom Southwick – Executive Producer

Track information and credits adapted from the album's liner notes.

References 

Nanci Griffith albums
1982 albums